The 2017 EAFF E-1 Football Championship was the 7th edition of the EAFF E-1 Football Championship, the football championship of East Asia. It was held in Japan in December 2017. Through the agreement between EAFF and ASEAN Football Federation (AFF), the winner of the tournament will qualified for the AFF–EAFF Champions Trophy.

The winner of the 2017 EAFF E-1 Football Championship, South Korea, qualified for the 2019 AFF–EAFF Champions Trophy to meet the winner of 2018 AFF Championship of Vietnam.

Team allocation
Based on their previous edition's results in 2015, the ten teams were allocated to their particular stage. Each winner of the preliminary round progressed to the next stage.

Venues

First preliminary round
The first preliminary round was held in Guam.

Table

Matches
All times are local (UTC+10).

Awards

Second preliminary round
The second preliminary round was held in Hong Kong.

Table

Matches
All times are local (UTC+8).

Awards

Final tournament

The final competition was held in Japan from 9 to 16 December 2017.

Squads

Table

Matches

All times are local (UTC+9).

Awards

Goalscorers

3 goals

 Kim Shin-wook

2 goals

 Wei Shihao
 Yu Dabao

 Yu Kobayashi

1 goal

 Yosuke Ideguchi
 Gen Shōji
 Jung Woo-young
 Lee Jae-sung

 Yeom Ki-hun
 Jong Il-gwan

 1 own goal

 Ri Yong-chol

Final ranking

Per statistical convention in football, matches decided in extra time are counted as wins and losses, while matches decided by penalty shoot-out are counted as draws.

Broadcasting rights
 : CCTV, PPTV and Guangdong Sports
 : Fuji TV
 : SPOTV
 : ViuTV
 : TDM (Macau)
 : Gala Television
 : Mongolian National Broadcaster
 : KGTF
 : Korean Central Television
 :

References

External links 
 

2017
East Asian Cup
East Asian Cup
International association football competitions hosted by Japan
EAFF